Lucy Katherine Chaffer (born 19 October 1983 in Perth, Australia) is an Australian skeleton racer. She competed for Australia at the 2014 Winter Olympics in Sochi in the skeleton events. She is also a team member of the four time winning premiership  hockey team, the Reds Women's 5's and is their lightning strike of a wing. She is famously known for her strong self passing ability.

Chaffer attended Santa Maria College, Perth and was a physical education teacher at the school.

References

External links
 

1983 births
Skeleton racers at the 2014 Winter Olympics
Living people
Olympic skeleton racers of Australia
Australian female skeleton racers
Sportswomen from Western Australia
Sportspeople from Perth, Western Australia
20th-century Australian women
21st-century Australian women